3-Nitrooxypropanol, abbreviated 3NOP, is an organic compound with the formula HOCH2CH2CH2ONO2.  It is the mononitrate ester of 1,3-propanediol.  The compound is an  inhibitor of the enzyme methyl coenzyme M reductase (MCR). MCR catalyzes the final step in methanogenesis.  When it is fed to ruminants, their methane production is diminished. In 2021 Bovaer, a feed additive for cows produced by DSM based on this compound, has been approved in Brazil, one of the world's largest meat exporters and also Chile. In 2022, it was approved for use on dairy cows in the EU.

See also
FutureFeed

References

Enzyme inhibitors
Nitrate esters
Anaerobic digestion
Biodegradable waste management
Animal feed